Low Teens is the eighth studio album by American metalcore band Every Time I Die. It is the band's only release to feature drummer Daniel Davison.

Release
On June 22, 2016, Low Teens was announced for release in September. In addition, "The Coin Has a Say" was made available for streaming. Low Teens was released on September 23 through independent label Epitaph Records. In September and October, the band went on a headlining tour of Canada with support from Knocked Loose and Hollow Earth. In January 2017, the band went on a tour of Australia with Letlive and Counterparts. In May, the band made appearances at the Carolina Rebellion, Northern Invasion and Rock on the Range festivals. In early June, the band performed at Download Festival in the UK, followed by a performance at UNIFY festival in Australia. In July and August, the band went on a co-headlining US tour with Taking Back Sunday. They were supported for the first half by Modern Chemistry and for the second half by All Get Out.

Track listing

Credits 
Writing, performance and production credits are adapted from the album liner notes.

Personnel

Every Time I Die 
 Keith Buckley – vocals
 Jordan Buckley – guitar
 Andrew Williams – guitar
 Stephen Micciche – bass
 Daniel Davison – drums

Guest musicians 
 Brendon Urie – vocals on "It Remembers"
 Tim Singer (Deadguy) – vocals on "Fear and Trembling"

Additional musicians 
 Randy LeBoeuf – piano on "Awful Lot"

Production 
 Will Putney – production, engineering, mixing
 Steve Seid – additional engineering
 Randy LeBeouf – additional engineering
 Jay Zubricky – engineering assistant
 Alan Douches – mastering

Visual art 
 Joby J. Ford – art, design

Studios 
 GCR Audio, Buffalo, NY – recording
 West West Side Music, New Windsor, NY – mastering

Charts

References

External links 
 
 Low Teens at Epitaph

2016 albums
Albums produced by Will Putney
Epitaph Records albums
Every Time I Die albums